The Jian'ou dialect (Northern Min:  / ;), also known as Kienow dialect, is a local dialect of Northern Min Chinese spoken in Jian'ou in northern Fujian province. It is regarded as the standard common language in Jian'ou.

Phonetics and phonology
According to The Eight Tones of Kien-chou, a rime dictionary published in 1795, the Jian'ou dialect had 15 initials, 34 rimes and 7 tones in the 18th century, however there are only 6 tones in the modern dialect as the "light level" tone has disappeared.

Initials

Rimes

Tones
Jian'ou has four tones, which are reduced to two in checked syllables.

Footnotes

References

External links
 Cantonese and other dialects (in Chinese)
 Classification of Northern Min Dialects from Glossika
 Jian'ou Romanized Vernacular Bible

Northern Min